Shuanghe is a county-level city in Xinjiang Uyghur Autonomous Region, People's Republic of China.

Name
The name Shuanghe means "two rivers", referring to the Bortala River and Jing River (Tsingho). It is named after the Tang dynasty administrative division Shuanghe Dudufu, which was established in the area in 658 AD.

History
The city was formerly the settled and cultivated areas of the Fifth Division of the Xinjiang Production and Construction Corps (XPCC). In January 2014, the State Council of China approved the establishment of Shuanghe City and the city was formally established on 26 February 2014. Shuanghe is the seventh city in Xinjiang converted from XPCC land, after Shihezi, Aral, Tumxuk, Wujiaqu, Beitun and Tiemenguan. Like the other cities of XPCC, it is a county-level city directly administered by Xinjiang Autonomous Region without an intervening prefectural government.

References

County-level divisions of Xinjiang
2014 establishments in China
Xinjiang Production and Construction Corps
Populated places in Xinjiang